Johan Peter Lefstad (1870–1948) was a Norwegian figure skater who competed in men's singles.

He won the bronze medal in men's single skating at the 1897 World Figure Skating Championships.

Competitive highlights

References 

1870 births
1948 deaths
Norwegian male single skaters
World Figure Skating Championships medalists